GGH may refer to:

 Gamma-glutamyl hydrolase
 Gartnavel General Hospital in Glasgow, Scotland
 GGH encryption scheme, an asymmetric lattice-based cryptosystem
 GGH signature scheme, a digital signature schemes
 Greater Golden Horseshoe, Ontario, Canada
 Ground glass hepatocyte
 Guelph General Hospital in Ontario, Canada